LGBT billionaires refers to people who identify as LGBT and who are billionaires, in relation to the monetary fortune they control and their net worth. 

, Italian fashion designer Giorgio Armani — who has a net worth of 8.1 billion — was the world's richest person who is openly part of the LGBT community (according to US LGBT-interest magazine The Advocate.)

History
In 1980, DreamWorks co-founder David Geffen came out as the first openly bisexual billionaire in the world. He had dated women before such as Cher, but finally came to terms with this sexuality in the early 1980s and had become one of the most important forces in the gay rights movement by 1992.

Giorgio Armani is known for being notoriously private and has remained relatively quiet about his own sexuality. The Sunday Times speculates he has remained quiet on the subject out of fear sales of Armani might decline in Asia if he officially came out. However, in 2000 he told Vanity Fair, "I have had women in my life. And sometimes men."

On 16 August 2013, Jennifer Pritzker made headlines by announcing that she identifies herself as a woman for all business and personal undertakings. This announcement made Pritzker the world's first openly transgender billionaire. In October 2015, Norway's second richest billionaire Stein Erik Hagen came out as bisexual on the Norwegian talk show Skavlan.

List

See also
 Lists of billionaires
 Black billionaires
 List of countries by the number of billionaires

References

Lists of people by wealth
Billionaires
Lists of LGBT-related people